The Americanization of Emily is a 1964 American romantic black comedy war film, written by Paddy Chayefsky, directed by Arthur Hiller, and starring James Garner, Julie Andrews, and Melvyn Douglas. The black-and-white film also features James Coburn, Joyce Grenfell, and Keenan Wynn. 

Chayefsky's screenplay was loosely adapted from the 1959 novel of the same name by William Bradford Huie, who had been a Seabee officer during the Normandy Invasion. The film is set in London during World War II in the weeks leading up to D-Day in June 1944.

Controversial for its stance during the dawn of the Vietnam War, the film has since been praised as a "vanguard anti-war film". Both James Garner and Julie Andrews have considered the film their personal favourite of those in which they acted.

Plot
Lt. Commander Charlie Madison is a cynical and highly efficient adjutant to Rear Admiral William Jessup. Charlie's job is to keep his boss and similar serving officers supplied with everything needed, including luxury goods and amiable women. He falls in love with a driver from the motor pool, Emily Barham, who has lost her husband, brother, and father in the war. Charlie's pleasure-seeking "American" lifestyle amid wartime rationing both fascinates and disgusts Emily, but she does not want to lose another loved one to war and finds the "practicing coward" Charlie irresistible.

Profoundly despondent since the death of his wife, Jessup obsesses over the United States Army and its Air Force overshadowing the Navy in the forthcoming D-Day invasion. The admiral decides that "The first dead man on Omaha Beach must be a sailor". A combat film will document the death, and the casualty will be buried in a "Tomb of the Unknown Sailor". He orders Charlie to get the film made.

Despite his best efforts to avoid the assignment, Charlie and his now gung-ho friend, Commander "Bus" Cummings, find themselves and a makeshift two-man film crew aboard ship with the combat engineers, who will be the first sailors ashore. When Charlie tries to retreat from the beach, Cummings shoots him in the leg with his Colt .45 pistol. A German artillery shell lands near the limping-running Charlie, making him the first American casualty on Omaha Beach. Hundreds of newspaper and magazine covers reprint the photograph of Charlie running, alone, making him a war hero. Having recovered from his breakdown, Jessup is horrified by his part in Charlie's death. He plans, however, to use the death in support of the Navy's upcoming appropriations while testifying before the Senate's joint military affairs committee. Emily is devastated to have lost another person she loves to the war.

Then comes unexpected news: Charlie is alive and now at the Allied 6th Relocation Center in Southampton, England. A relieved Jessup plans to show him off during his Senate testimony as the "first man on Omaha Beach", a sailor. Limping from his injury and angry about his senseless near-death, Charlie plans to act nobly by telling the world the truth about what really happened, even if it means being imprisoned for cowardice while facing the enemy. By recounting to him what he had said to her previously, Emily is able to persuade Charlie to choose happiness with her instead, and to keep quiet and accept his new, unwanted role as a hero.

Cast

 James Garner as Lt. Cmdr. Charles "Charlie" E. Madison
 Julie Andrews as Emily Barham
 Melvyn Douglas as Admiral William Jessup
 Paul Newlan as Gen. William Hallerton
 James Coburn as Lt. Cmdr. Paul "Bus" Cummings
 Joyce Grenfell as Mrs. Barham
 Keenan Wynn as Old Sailor
 Edward Binns as Admiral Thomas Healy
 Liz Fraser as Sheila

 William Windom as Captain Harry Spaulding
 John Crawford as Chief Petty Officer Paul Adams
 Douglas Henderson as Captain Marvin Ellender
 Edmon Ryan as Admiral Hoyle
 Steve Franken as Young Sailor
 Alan Sues as Petty Officer Enright
 Judy Carne as "2nd Nameless Broad"
 Sharon Tate as "Beautiful Girl" (uncredited)
 Red West as Soldier (uncredited)

Production

Casting
According to James Garner, William Holden was originally meant to play the lead role of Charlie Madison, with Garner to play Bus Cummings. When Holden backed out of the project, Garner took the lead role and James Coburn was brought in to play Bus. Lee Marvin is mentioned as starring in the movie instead of Coburn in Metro-Goldwyn-Mayer's promotional film MGM Is on the Move! (1964)

Soundtrack
The film introduced the song "Emily", composed by Johnny Mandel with lyrics by Johnny Mercer. It was recorded by Frank Sinatra with Nelson Riddle arranging and conducting on October 3, 1964 and was included on the Reprise LP Softly, as I Leave You. It was later recorded by Andy Williams for Dear Heart (1965) and by Barbra Streisand for The Movie Album (2003).

Fashion
The women's hairstyles, dress fashions, makeup, and shoes seen in the film have been criticized for being appropriate for 1964, not 1944.

Filming
The hotel suite party scene was filmed on November 22, 1963, the same day as President John F. Kennedy's assassination.

Comparison with the novel

The Americanization of Emily is based on William Bradford Huie's 1959 novel of the same name. The New York Times ran a brief news item mentioning Huie's novel prior to its publication, but never reviewed it, although in 1963 Paddy Chayefsky's development of the novel into a screenplay was found worthy of note. A first draft of the film's screenplay was written by George Goodman, who previously had a success at MGM with The Wheeler Dealers (1963), also with James Garner as the male lead and with the same director and producer. In 1964, a Broadway musical with music written by John Barry was announced. Chayefsky's adaptation, while retaining the title, characters, situation, background and many specific plot incidents, told a very different story. He said, "I found the book, which is serious in tone, essentially a funny satire, and that's how I'm treating it."

The screenplay's theme of cowardice as a virtue has no parallel in the novel; in fact, the novel does not mention cowardice at all.

The screenplay implies, but never explicitly explains, what is meant by the term "Americanization". The novel uses "Americanized" to refer to a woman who accepts, as a normal condition of wartime, the exchange of her sexual favors for gifts of rare wartime commodities. Thus, in reply to the question "Has Pat been Americanized?", a character answers:

This theme runs throughout the novel. Another character says, "We operate just like a whorehouse ... except we don't sell it for cash. We swap it for Camels [cigarettes] and nylons [stockings] and steak and eggs and lipstick ... this dress ... came from Saks Fifth Avenue in the diplomatic pouch". Emily asks Jimmy, "Am I behaving like a whore?" Jimmy replies, "Whoring is a peacetime activity".

The screenplay uses Hershey bars to symbolize the luxuries enjoyed by Americans and their "Americanized" companions, but the novel uses strawberries.

The novel briefly mentions that Emily's mother, Mrs. Barham, has been mentally affected by wartime stress, but she is not a major character. There is no mention of her self-deception or pretense that her husband and son are still alive. The film contains a long scene between Charlie and Mrs. Barham, full of eloquent antiwar rhetoric, in which Charlie breaks down Mrs. Barham's denial and reduces her to tears while insisting that he has performed an act of kindness. The novel has no parallel to this scene.

In the film, Charlie is comically unprepared to make the documentary film demanded by Admiral Jessup and is assisted only by bumbling drunken servicemen played by Keenan Wynn and Steve Franken. But in the novel, Charlie has been a public relations professional in civilian life, takes the assignment seriously, and leads a team of competent cinematographers.

Reception

Critical
In a contemporary review for The New York Times, critic Bosley Crowther praised Chayefsky's screenplay as including "some remarkably good writing with some slashing irreverence".

The Americanization of Emily has a 93% rating at the review aggregator website Rotten Tomatoes, based on fourteen reviews, with an average rating of 7.39/10. In Slant magazine, Nick Schager wrote, "Though a bit overstuffed with long-winded speeches, Chayefsky's scabrously funny script brims with snappy, crackling dialogue". In A Journey Through American Literature, academic Kevin J. Hayes praised Chayefsky's speeches for Garner as "stirring".

Awards and honors
The film was nominated for Academy Awards in 1965 for Best Art Direction and Best Cinematography, and in 1966 Julie Andrews' portrayal of Emily earned her a nomination for a BAFTA Award for Best British Actress.

The Americanization of Emily was among the films selected for The New York Times Guide to the Best 1,000 Movies Ever Made.

Home media
The Americanization of Emily was released on Blu-ray by Warner Home Video on March 11, 2014 via their on-demand Warner Archive.

See also
 List of American films of 1964
 List of anti-war films

References

External links

 
 
 
 
 
 James Garner Interview on the Charlie Rose Show 
 James Garner interview at Archive of American Television

1964 films
1964 comedy-drama films
1964 romantic comedy films
1960s English-language films
American comedy-drama films
American black-and-white films
American romantic comedy films
American war drama films
Anti-war films about World War II
Films based on American novels
Films based on military novels
Films directed by Arthur Hiller
Films scored by Johnny Mandel
Films with screenplays by Paddy Chayefsky
Films shot at MGM-British Studios
Films set in 1944
Films set in London
Metro-Goldwyn-Mayer films
Military humor in film
Operation Overlord films
War romance films
Filmways films
1960s American films